He's the DJ, I'm the Rapper (also known as I'm the Rapper, He's the DJ due to the way the title is printed) is the second studio album by hip hop duo DJ Jazzy Jeff & The Fresh Prince. It was the first double album in hip hop music, in its original vinyl incarnation.

The album was certified triple platinum by the Recording Industry Association of America (RIAA) on February 1, 1995, and is the duo's most successful album. In 1998, the album was selected as one of The Source magazine's 100 Best Rap Albums.

Singles
The album's first single, "Brand New Funk", was only released promotionally and, thus, failed to achieve any commercial success. However, the album's second single, "Parents Just Don't Understand", won the first-ever Grammy Award for Best Rap Performance and reached number 12 on the US Billboard Hot 100.  Although the album's third single, "Nightmare on My Street", which reached number 15 on the US Billboard Hot 100, was considered for inclusion in the movie A Nightmare on Elm Street 4: The Dream Master, the producers of the film decided against its inclusion. As a result, later vinyl pressings of the album contain a disclaimer sticker that says, "[This song] is not part of the soundtrack...and is not authorized, licensed, or affiliated with the Nightmare on Elm Street films."

Track listings

Original vinyl and cassette release
While released as a double album, Sides C and D were labeled as "Bonus Scratch Album."

Original CD release
On the original CD, "Nightmare on My Street", "As We Go", "D.J. on the Wheels," and the final four songs appeared in edited form, and "Another Special Announcement" was omitted. A German edition omitted "Jazzy's in the House" and "Human Video Game" instead. On September 8, 2017, the full vinyl version was finally issued as a double CD set that was released by Real Gone Music under license from Sony Music Entertainment with bonus tracks.

Samples and Interpolations
"A Nightmare on My Street"
 Theme from A Nightmare on Elm Street by Charles Bernstein

"Here We Go Again"
 "Westchester Lady" by Bob James

"Brand New Funk"
 "Bouncy Lady" by Pleasure
 "Funky President (People It's Bad)" by James Brown
 "I Can't Live Without My Radio" by LL Cool J
 "(Fallin' Like) Dominoes" by Donald Byrd

"As We Go"
 "Impeach the President" by The Honey Drippers

"Parents Just Don't Understand"
 "Won't You Be My Friend" by Peter Frampton

"Pump Up The Bass"
 "Funky Drummer" by James Brown

"Let's Get Busy, Baby"
 "Sir Duke" by Stevie Wonder

"Time To Chill"
 "Breezin'" by George Benson

"He's the D.J., I'm the Rapper"
 "Jungle Love" by Steve Miller Band

"Live At Union Square (November 1986)"
 "Got to Be Real" by Cheryl Lynn
 "Apache" by Incredible Bongo Band
 "Dance To The Drummer's Beat" by Herman Kelly and Life

Charts

Weekly charts

Year-end charts

Certifications

References

1988 albums
DJ Jazzy Jeff & The Fresh Prince albums
Jive Records albums